Samkhiel ("God is my support") is the angel of destruction who oversees the punishments of the beinonim, the “morally divided” souls who are sent to Gehenna. Through fiery torments he cleanses the souls of their wickedness and afterwards, assists in their eventual return to God (III Enoch; BhM 5:186).

See also 
 Angel
 Angels in Judaism
 Gehenna

References 

Angels in Judaism
Individual angels